Marbleton is a town in Sublette County, Wyoming, United States. The population was 1,094 at the 2010 census.

Geography
Marbleton is located at  (42.557108, -110.106196).

Climate
Marbleton has a subarctic climate (Koppen: Dfc), with generally warm, sometimes hot summers, and brutally cold and long winters. Diurnal temperature range is very high all year round, but even more so during summertime, with August having an average daily temperature range of 42 degrees Fahrenheit (23.3 Celsius).   The nearest official weather station is in nearby Big Piney.

Demographics

2010 census
As of the census of 2010, there were 1,094 people, 415 households, and 273 families residing in the town. The racial makeup of the town was 87.4% White, 0.2% African American, 0.8% Native American, 0.2% Asian, 9.0% from other races, and 2.4% from two or more races. Hispanic or Latino of any race were 13.3% of the population.

There were 415 households, of which 38.3% had children under the age of 18 living with them, 49.2% were married couples living together, 7.5% had a female householder with no husband present, 9.2% had a male householder with no wife present, and 34.2% were non-families. 26.3% of all households were made up of individuals, and 6.7% had someone living alone who was 65 years of age or older. The average household size was 2.55 and the average family size was 3.05.

The median age in the town was 33 years. 27% of residents were under the age of 18; 9.9% were between the ages of 18 and 24; 30.6% were from 25 to 44; 24.6% were from 45 to 64; and 7.8% were 65 years of age or older. The gender makeup of the town was 56.9% male and 43.1% female.

2000 census
As of the census of 2000, there were 720 people, 268 households, and 201 families residing in the town. The population density was 1,060.8 people per square mile (408.8/km2). There were 310 housing units at an average density of 456.7 per square mile (176.0/km2). The racial makeup of the town was 96.25% White, 0.42% African American, 0.69% Native American, 0.42% Asian, 0.14% Pacific Islander, 0.56% from other races, and 1.53% from two or more races. Hispanic or Latino of any race were 1.67% of the population.

There were 268 households, out of which 42.5% had children under the age of 18 living with them, 64.2% were married couples living together, 6.0% had a female householder with no husband present, and 25.0% were non-families. 20.1% of all households were made up of individuals, and 2.2% had someone living alone who was 65 years of age or older. The average household size was 2.69 and the average family size was 3.09.

In the town, the population was spread out, with 31.1% under the age of 18, 8.1% from 18 to 24, 33.1% from 25 to 44, 22.6% from 45 to 64, and 5.1% who were 65 years of age or older. The median age was 34 years. For every 100 females, there were 106.3 males. For every 100 females age 18 and over, there were 105.8 males.

The median income for a household in the town was $41,406, and the median income for a family was $46,250. Males had a median income of $38,250 versus $17,500 for females. The per capita income for the town was $18,446. About 3.2% of families and 4.2% of the population were below the poverty line, including 5.8% of those under age 18 and none of those age 65 or over.

Education
Public education in the town of Marbleton is provided by Sublette County School District #9.

References

External links
 Marbleton area information
 Sublette County information
 Chamber of Commerce

Towns in Sublette County, Wyoming
Towns in Wyoming